The 62nd Primetime Emmy Awards, presented by the Academy of Television Arts & Sciences, were held on Sunday, August 29, 2010, at the Nokia Theatre in Downtown Los Angeles, California beginning at 5:00 p.m. PDT (00:00 UTC; August 30). Comedian and Late Night host Jimmy Fallon hosted the ceremony for the first time.

The ceremony honored the best in prime time television programming from June 1, 2009 until May 31, 2010. The HBO miniseries The Pacific won eight awards, the most for any program this year, including Outstanding Miniseries. ABC's freshman series Modern Family was the most honored comedy series of the year with six awards, including Outstanding Comedy Series. Modern Family would go on to win again the top prize for four more years (2010-2014) to reach a record five Outstanding Comedy Series wins. AMC's period piece drama Mad Men won four awards, including Outstanding Drama Series, its third consecutive victory in that category. The HBO film Temple Grandin won five major awards, tying the record for most major wins by a television film, set by Promise in 1987.

The ceremony was telecast live coast-to-coast in the United States by NBC, the first such broadcast since ABC did so for the 34th ceremony held in 1976. The ceremony was held before its usual mid-September date to avoid a conflict with NBC Sunday Night Football.

On August 21, 2010, the Creative Arts Emmy Awards were presented at the same venue. E! aired clips from the ceremony on August 28, the evening preceding the night of the primetime telecast.

The ceremony was received well by critics, with much praise going to the quality of the production, the voting trends and the entertainment factor. Jimmy Fallon received unanimous acclaim for his performance as the host, with some critics citing him as one of the greatest Emmy hosts in recent times.

Winners and nominees

Winners are listed first and highlighted in bold:

Programs

Acting

Lead performances

Supporting performances

Directing

Writing

Most major nominations
By network
 HBO – 38
 ABC / CBS / NBC – 16
 AMC – 14
 Fox – 11

By program
 Glee (Fox) – 11
 30 Rock (NBC) / Mad Men (AMC) – 10
 Modern Family (ABC) – 9
 The Good Wife (CBS) / Lost (ABC) / Temple Grandin (HBO) / You Don't Know Jack (HBO) – 7
 Saturday Night Live (NBC) – 6

Most major awards
By network
 HBO – 8
 AMC / CBS – 4
 ABC – 3
 Fox / Showtime – 2

By program
 Temple Grandin (HBO) – 5
 Modern Family (ABC) – 3
 You Don't Know Jack (HBO) / Mad Men (AMC) – 2 Breaking Bad (AMC) - 2

Notes

Presenters
The awards were presented by the following:

In Memoriam
The singer Jewel performed an original song called "The Shape of You" (which would later be released on her 2015 album Picking Up the Pieces) during the tribute:

 Art Linkletter
 Fess Parker
 Jimmy Dean
 Art Clokey
 Gene Barry
 Roy E. Disney
 Dorothy DeBorba
 Soupy Sales
 Jean Simmons
 Peter Graves
 Robert Culp
 Caroline McWilliams
 Merlin Olsen
 Pernell Roberts
 Patricia Neal
 Bernie West
 David Lloyd
 Maury Chaykin
 Corey Haim
 Edward Woodward
 James Gammon
 Joanne Dillon
 Andrew Koenig
 Gary Coleman
 John Forsythe
 Rue McClanahan
 Phil Harris
 Brittany Murphy
 Dixie Carter
 Lynn Redgrave
 Lena Horne
 Dennis Hopper
 David L. Wolper

Opening number
This Primetime Emmy telecast commenced with a cold open spoofing the musical drama series Glee. Host Jimmy Fallon convinces several Glee castmembers to "enlist" in a singing competition in order for them to earn money for tickets to the Emmy ceremony. Together they recruit several nominees and famous television personalities in and around the Nokia Theatre for help. They break out in song to Bruce Springsteen's "Born to Run".

People who appeared in the opening segment/number:
 Chris Colfer
 Nina Dobrev
 Jimmy Fallon
 Tina Fey
 Jorge Garcia
 Kate Gosselin
 Tim Gunn
 Jon Hamm
 Randy Jackson
 Jane Lynch
 Joel McHale
 Lea Michele
 Cory Monteith
 Amber Riley
 Betty White

References

External links
 Emmys.com list of 2010 Nominees & Winners
 Academy of Television Arts & Sciences website
 

062
Primetime Emmy Awards
Emmy Awards
Emmy Awards
2010 awards in the United States
August 2010 events in the United States
Television shows directed by Glenn Weiss